Kallar Kahar Interchange is an interchange on the M2 motorway in District Chakwal. It exits the M2 at Choa Saidanshah Road.It exits the M2 motorway at Kallar Kahar. It facilitates the village of Kallar Kahar people and all other nearby villages.

Location 
It is situated between the Balkasar Interchange and Lillah Interchange on the M2. It is the 17th exit on the motorway moving from Lahore to Islamabad. and Fourth exit moving from Islamabad to Lahore.

See also
Chakwal Police And Rescue Departements
Tourism in Chakwal
Neelah Dullah Interchange
Balkasar Interchange
Chakwal Transport System

Road interchanges in Pakistan